The 1939 Brooklyn Dodgers started the year with a new manager, Leo Durocher, who became both the team's manager and starting shortstop. They also became the first New York NL team to have a regular radio broadcast, with Red Barber handing the announcers job, and the first team to have a television broadcast (during their August 26 home game doubleheaders against the Reds, both of which WNBT covered for the NBC network). The team finished in third place, showing some improvement over the previous seasons.

Offseason 
 December 13, 1938: Fred Frankhouse was traded by the Dodgers to the Boston Bees for Joe Stripp.
 December 13, 1938: Lew Krausse and cash were traded by the Dodgers to the St. Louis Cardinals for Jimmy Outlaw.
 December 13, 1938: Jimmy Outlaw and Buddy Hassett were traded by the Dodgers to the Boston Bees for Gene Moore and Ira Hutchinson.
 December 19, 1938: Luke Sewell was purchased by the Dodgers from the Chicago White Sox.
 February 2, 1939: Tom Lanning was purchased by the Dodgers from the Philadelphia Phillies.
 February 6, 1939: Kemp Wicker and Chris Hartje were purchased by the Dodgers from the New York Yankees.
 February 23, 1939: Woody English was purchased from the Dodgers by the Chicago Cubs.
 March 31, 1939: Bill Posedel was traded by the Dodgers to the Boston Bees for Al Todd.

Regular season

Season standings

Record vs. opponents

Notable transactions 
 May 3, 1939: Lyn Lary was purchased by the Dodgers from the Cleveland Indians.
 June 15, 1939: Mel Almada was purchased by the Dodgers from the St. Louis Browns.
 July 18, 1939: Pee Wee Reese was purchased by the Dodgers from the Boston Red Sox.
 August 12, 1939: Herman Besse was purchased from the Dodgers by the Philadelphia Athletics.
 August 12, 1939: Al Hollingsworth was purchased by the Dodgers from the New York Yankees.
 August 17, 1939: Rae Blaemire was purchased from the Dodgers by the New York Giants.
 August 23, 1939: Ray Hayworth was traded by the Dodgers to the New York Giants for Jimmy Ripple

Roster

Player stats

Batting

Starters by position 
Note: Pos = Position; G = Games played; AB = At bats; H = Hits; Avg. = Batting average; HR = Home runs; RBI = Runs batted in

Other batters 
Note: G = Games played; AB = At bats; H = Hits; Avg. = Batting average; HR = Home runs; RBI = Runs batted in

Pitching

Starting pitchers 
Note: G = Games pitched; IP = Innings pitched; W = Wins; L = Losses; ERA = Earned run average; SO = Strikeouts

Other pitchers 
Note: G = Games pitched; IP = Innings pitched; W = Wins; L = Losses; ERA = Earned run average; SO = Strikeouts

Relief pitchers 
Note: G = Games pitched; W = Wins; L = Losses; SV = Saves; ERA = Earned run average; SO = Strikeouts

Awards and honors 
1939 Major League Baseball All-Star Game
Dolph Camilli reserve
Cookie Lavagetto reserve
Babe Phelps reserve
Whit Wyatt reserve
TSN Manager of the Year Award
Leo Durocher
TSN Major League Executive of the Year Award
Larry MacPhail

League top five finishers 
Dolph Camilli
 #3 in NL in home runs (26)
 #4 in NL in runs batted in (104)
 #4 in NL in runs scored (105)
 #4 in NL in on-base percentage (.409)
 #4 in NL in slugging percentage (.524)

Hugh Casey
 #4 in NL in earned run average (2.93)

Luke Hamlin
 #4 in NL in wins (20)

Cookie Lavagetto
 #4 in NL in stolen bases (14)

Farm system 

LEAGUE CHAMPIONS: Greenwood, Pine Bluff

Notes

References 
Baseball-Reference season page
Baseball Almanac season page

External links 
 1939 Brooklyn Dodgers uniform
Brooklyn Dodgers reference site
Acme Dodgers page 
Retrosheet

Brooklyn Dodgers
Los Angeles Dodgers seasons
Brooklyn Dodgers
Brooklyn
1930s in Brooklyn
Flatbush, Brooklyn